Viridothelium is a genus of lichen-forming fungi in the family Trypetheliaceae. It has 11 species. The genus was circumscribed by Robert Lücking  Matthew Nelsen, and André Aptroot in 2016, with Viridothelium virens assigned as the type species. Lichens in this genus were previously assigned to genus Trypethelium, as part of the Trypethelium virens clade.

Species
Viridothelium cinereoglaucescens 
Viridothelium indutum 
Viridothelium inspersum 
Viridothelium kinabaluense 
Viridothelium leptoseptatum 
Viridothelium megaspermum 
Viridothelium solomonense 
Viridothelium tricolor 
Viridothelium ustulatum 
Viridothelium virens 
Viridothelium vonkonratii

References

Trypetheliaceae
Dothideomycetes genera
Lichen genera
Taxa described in 2016
Taxa named by André Aptroot
Taxa named by Robert Lücking